Jack T. Redmond was an Australian professional rugby league footballer who played in the 1920s for the Western Suburbs, as a . 'Tony' played all of his games on the wing and was the league's top try-scorer in 1928, with a total of 9 tries in 9 games.

References

External links
Jack Redmond at Rugby League project

Australian rugby league players
Place of birth missing
Place of death missing
Rugby league wingers
Western Suburbs Magpies players
Year of birth missing
Year of death missing